William H. Selden (October 10, 1866 – August 26, 1926), alternately spelled "Seldon", was an American pre-Negro league pitcher in the late 1800s.

A native of Norfolk, Virginia, Selden began his professional career in 1887 with the Boston Resolutes. A dominating pitcher, Selden posted a 15–6 record with a 2.63 ERA and 100 strikeouts for the York Monarchs in 1890. He continued to pitch professionally through 1899, and worked as a vaudeville performer during the off-season. Selden died in Boston, Massachusetts in 1926 at age 59.

References

External links
  and Seamheads

1866 births
1926 deaths
Cuban Giants players
Cuban X-Giants players
New York Gorhams players
20th-century African-American people
Baseball pitchers